Alena Olsen (born 6 December 1995) is an American rugby sevens player. She captains the Headliners women's team in the Premier Rugby Sevens competition.

In 2021, Olsen and some of her teammates released a video that urged fans to sign the Global Climate Pledge, an initiative by the United States Green Chamber of Commerce.

Olsen competed for the United States at the 2022 Rugby World Cup Sevens in Cape Town. They lost to France in the bronze medal final and finished fourth overall.

References

External links
Alena Olsen at Team USA

Living people
1995 births
Female rugby union players
American female rugby union players
United States international rugby sevens players